Havelock Town Grama Niladhari Division is a Grama Niladhari Division of the Thimbirigasyaya Divisional Secretariat of Colombo District of Western Province, Sri Lanka.

Isipathanaramaya Temple, Colts Cricket Club Ground, Havelock Park, Hejaaz International School, Havelock City, St. Peter's College, Colombo, Isipathana College, Bambalapitiya, Milagiriya and Visakha Vidyalaya are located within, nearby or associated with Havelock Town.

Havelock Town is a surrounded by the Milagiriya, Kirula, Wellawatta North and Thimbirigasyaya Grama Niladhari Divisions.

Demographics

Ethnicity 

The Havelock Town Grama Niladhari Division has a Sinhalese plurality (39.1%), a significant Sri Lankan Tamil population (36.1%) and a significant Moor population (17.7%). In comparison, the Thimbirigasyaya Divisional Secretariat (which contains the Havelock Town Grama Niladhari Division) has a Sinhalese majority (52.8%), a significant Sri Lankan Tamil population (28.0%) and a significant Moor population (15.1%)

Religion 

The Havelock Town Grama Niladhari Division has a Hindu plurality (33.6%), a significant Buddhist population (30.3%) and a significant Muslim population (20.5%). In comparison, the Thimbirigasyaya Divisional Secretariat (which contains the Havelock Town Grama Niladhari Division) has a Buddhist plurality (47.9%), a significant Hindu population (22.5%) and a significant Muslim population (17.4%)

Gallery

References 

Grama Niladhari Divisions of Thimbirigasyaya Divisional Secretariat